Baseball at the 2010 South American Games in Medellín, Colombia, was held from March 22 to March 27. All games were played at Estadio Atanasio Girardot.

Medal summary

Medalists

Results

First round

Standings

Final Round

See also
Baseball awards#Americas
America Baseball Cup
Baseball at the Pan American Games
Baseball at the Central American and Caribbean Games

References

2010 South American Games
South American Games
2010
2010 South American Games